Moscow City Duma District 2 is one of 45 constituencies in Moscow City Duma. The constituency has covered parts of North-Western and Northern Moscow since 2014. From 1993-2005 District 2 also was based in Central Moscow; from 2005-2014 the constituency was based in Northern Moscow (it actually overlapped the entirety of State Duma Leningradsky constituency in 2005-2009).

Members elected

Election results

2001

|-
! colspan=2 style="background-color:#E9E9E9;text-align:left;vertical-align:top;" |Candidate
! style="background-color:#E9E9E9;text-align:left;vertical-align:top;" |Party
! style="background-color:#E9E9E9;text-align:right;" |Votes
! style="background-color:#E9E9E9;text-align:right;" |%
|-
|style="background-color:#1042A5"|
|align=left|Mikhail Moskvin-Tarkhanov (incumbent)
|align=left|Union of Right Forces
|
|27.39%
|-
|style="background-color:"|
|align=left|Yelena Karpukhina
|align=left|Communist Party
|
|23.75%
|-
|style="background-color:"|
|align=left|Anatoly Andryushchenko
|align=left|Independent
|
|12.41%
|-
|style="background-color:"|
|align=left|Irina Botsu
|align=left|Independent
|
|10.21%
|-
|style="background-color:"|
|align=left|Ksenia Nazarova
|align=left|Independent
|
|5.37%
|-
|style="background-color:"|
|align=left|Vadim Kazachenko
|align=left|Liberal Democratic Party
|
|3.88%
|-
|style="background-color:#000000"|
|colspan=2 |against all
|
|14.07%
|-
| colspan="5" style="background-color:#E9E9E9;"|
|- style="font-weight:bold"
| colspan="3" style="text-align:left;" | Total
| 
| 100%
|-
| colspan="5" style="background-color:#E9E9E9;"|
|- style="font-weight:bold"
| colspan="4" |Source:
|
|}

2005

|-
! colspan=2 style="background-color:#E9E9E9;text-align:left;vertical-align:top;" |Candidate
! style="background-color:#E9E9E9;text-align:left;vertical-align:top;" |Party
! style="background-color:#E9E9E9;text-align:right;" |Votes
! style="background-color:#E9E9E9;text-align:right;" |%
|-
|style="background-color:"|
|align=left|Igor Antonov (incumbent)
|align=left|United Russia
|
|29.34%
|-
|style="background-color:"|
|align=left|Irina Rukina (incumbent)
|align=left|Russian Party of Life
|
|21.15%
|-
|style="background-color:"|
|align=left|Vladimir Ulas
|align=left|Communist Party
|
|20.49%
|-
|style="background-color:"|
|align=left|Tatyana Filippova
|align=left|Rodina
|
|13.10%
|-
|style="background-color:"|
|align=left|Aleksey Anisimov
|align=left|Liberal Democratic Party
|
|5.46%
|-
|style="background-color:"|
|align=left|Marina Godovanets
|align=left|Independent
|
|4.77%
|-
| colspan="5" style="background-color:#E9E9E9;"|
|- style="font-weight:bold"
| colspan="3" style="text-align:left;" | Total
| 
| 100%
|-
| colspan="5" style="background-color:#E9E9E9;"|
|- style="font-weight:bold"
| colspan="4" |Source:
|
|}

2009

|-
! colspan=2 style="background-color:#E9E9E9;text-align:left;vertical-align:top;" |Candidate
! style="background-color:#E9E9E9;text-align:left;vertical-align:top;" |Party
! style="background-color:#E9E9E9;text-align:right;" |Votes
! style="background-color:#E9E9E9;text-align:right;" |%
|-
|style="background-color:"|
|align=left|Igor Antonov (incumbent)
|align=left|United Russia
|
|58.12%
|-
|style="background-color:"|
|align=left|Vladimir Ulas
|align=left|Communist Party
|
|19.46%
|-
|style="background-color:"|
|align=left|Vyacheslav Gumenyuk
|align=left|A Just Russia
|
|6.95%
|-
|style="background-color:"|
|align=left|Yelena Guseva
|align=left|Independent
|
|6.56%
|-
|style="background-color:"|
|align=left|Natalya Konshina
|align=left|Liberal Democratic Party
|
|3.89%
|-
|style="background-color:"|
|align=left|Rustam Rabadanov
|align=left|Independent
|
|1.17%
|-
| colspan="5" style="background-color:#E9E9E9;"|
|- style="font-weight:bold"
| colspan="3" style="text-align:left;" | Total
| 
| 100%
|-
| colspan="5" style="background-color:#E9E9E9;"|
|- style="font-weight:bold"
| colspan="4" |Source:
|
|}

2014

|-
! colspan=2 style="background-color:#E9E9E9;text-align:left;vertical-align:top;" |Candidate
! style="background-color:#E9E9E9;text-align:left;vertical-align:top;" |Party
! style="background-color:#E9E9E9;text-align:right;" |Votes
! style="background-color:#E9E9E9;text-align:right;" |%
|-
|style="background-color:"|
|align=left|Olga Yaroslavskaya
|align=left|Independent
|
|38.63%
|-
|style="background-color:"|
|align=left|Yelena Shmeleva
|align=left|Communist Party
|
|22.49%
|-
|style="background-color:"|
|align=left|Mikhail Peskov
|align=left|Yabloko
|
|16.10%
|-
|style="background-color:"|
|align=left|Sergey Tsapenko
|align=left|A Just Russia
|
|10.05%
|-
|style="background-color:"|
|align=left|Svetlana Zolotaryova
|align=left|Independent
|
|5.47%
|-
|style="background-color:"|
|align=left|Yegor Anisimov
|align=left|Liberal Democratic Party
|
|3.74%
|-
| colspan="5" style="background-color:#E9E9E9;"|
|- style="font-weight:bold"
| colspan="3" style="text-align:left;" | Total
| 
| 100%
|-
| colspan="5" style="background-color:#E9E9E9;"|
|- style="font-weight:bold"
| colspan="4" |Source:
|
|}

2019

|-
! colspan=2 style="background-color:#E9E9E9;text-align:left;vertical-align:top;" |Candidate
! style="background-color:#E9E9E9;text-align:left;vertical-align:top;" |Party
! style="background-color:#E9E9E9;text-align:right;" |Votes
! style="background-color:#E9E9E9;text-align:right;" |%
|-
|style="background-color:"|
|align=left|Dmitry Loktev
|align=left|Communist Party
|
|39.80%
|-
|style="background-color:"|
|align=left|Svetlana Volovets
|align=left|Independent
|
|37.13%
|-
|style="background-color:"|
|align=left|Andrey Petrov
|align=left|Liberal Democratic Party
|
|9.12%
|-
|style="background-color:"|
|align=left|Vladislav Zhukov
|align=left|A Just Russia
|
|7.41%
|-
|style="background-color:"|
|align=left|Pavel Rassudov
|align=left|Independent
|
|2.76%
|-
| colspan="5" style="background-color:#E9E9E9;"|
|- style="font-weight:bold"
| colspan="3" style="text-align:left;" | Total
| 
| 100%
|-
| colspan="5" style="background-color:#E9E9E9;"|
|- style="font-weight:bold"
| colspan="4" |Source:
|
|}

Notes

References

Moscow City Duma districts